Po‘e or poke is a Polynesian pudding usually eaten as a dessert.

Etymology
The Tahitian word po'e is derived from the proto-Polynesian root poke which means "to mix", "to knead". It is still called poke in all Polynesian languages except in the Tahitian language and in the Austral language on the island of Raivavae where the glottal stop (written as an apostrophe ') has replaced the voiceless velar stop (k).

Preparation
Traditionally po'e was made by cooking and mashing bananas into a smooth consistency and mixing together with arrowroot flour. The mixture was wrapped in banana leaves and baked in an earth oven until set into a pudding-like consistency, cut into smaller pieces and served together with coconut cream. Modern versions of the recipe replace bananas with other fruits such as papaya, mango or squash and using cassava or corn starch as the thickening agent.

See also

 Kulolo – a traditional Hawaiian dessert, made from grated taro and coconut milk baked into a pudding
 Poi – a similar traditional banana dessert, from Samoa

References

External links
Po'e recipe at W4E

Oceanian cuisine
Pascuense cuisine
Puddings
Fruit dishes
Cook Islands cuisine
French Polynesian cuisine
Foods containing coconut
Polynesian cuisine